Pinto is a Chilean town and commune in Diguillín Province, Ñuble Region. It is bordered by the commune of Coihueco to the north, Chillán and San Ignacio to the west, and El Carmen and Antuco to the south. The commune shares its eastern border with the Argentine province of Neuquén.

Demographics
Of these, 4,278 (43.3%) lived in urban areas and 5,597 (56.7%) in rural areas. The population grew by 10.6% (943 persons) between the 1992 and 2002 censuses . Within ten population increases by 10.6%.

Administration
As a commune, Pinto is a third-level administrative division of Chile administered by a municipal council, headed by an alcalde who is directly elected every four years. The 2008-2012 alcalde is Fernando Chavez Guiñez (UDI).

Within the electoral divisions of Chile, Pinto is represented in the Chamber of Deputies by Carlos Abel Jarpa  (PRSD) and Rosauro Martínez (RN) as part of the 41st electoral district, together with Chillán, Coihueco, San Ignacio, El Carmen, Pemuco, Yungay and Chillán Viejo. The commune is represented in the Senate by Victor Pérez Varela (UDI) and Mariano Ruiz-Esquide Jara (PDC) as part of the 13th senatorial constituency (Biobío-Coast).

References

External links
  Municipality of Pinto

Communes of Chile
Populated places in Diguillín Province